The 2004 World Snooker Championship (also referred to as the 2004 Embassy World Snooker Championship for the purposes of sponsorship) was a professional ranking snooker tournament that took place between 17 April and 3 May 2004 at the Crucible Theatre in Sheffield, England.

Mark Williams was the defending champion, but he lost in the second round 11–13 against Joe Perry.

Ronnie O'Sullivan won his second world title by defeating Graeme Dott 18–8 in the final, despite having trailed Dott 0–5. This was the fourth biggest margin in a World final, subsequently equalled by O'Sullivan against Ali Carter in 2008, and Kyren Wilson in 2020. The tournament was sponsored by cigarette manufacturer Embassy.

Tournament summary
Ryan Day and Stephen Maguire were the only debutants this year. Day narrowly lost 9–10 to 1998 champion John Higgins and Maguire lost 6–10 to eventual winner and 2001 champion Ronnie O'Sullivan; both in round one.
Chris Small was forced to retire from his first round match against Alan McManus due to pain from a degenerative spinal disease. His condition would later force him to retire from the game permanently.
 Andy Hicks reached the second round by beating Quinten Hann in a match memorable for a near punch-up between the two players at the end, triggered by Hicks pointing out to Hann that he was likely to drop out of the top 16 as a result of the loss.
Barry Pinches reached the last 16 for the first time in his career. defeated Jimmy White 10–8 in a match which overran and had to be completed after other matches. In the second round, he led Stephen Hendry 11–9 before losing a tight match 12–13. The 13-year gap between Pinches' first two Crucible appearances (1991–2004) remains an all-time record.
Six seeded players, Stephen Lee; Hann; Steve Davis; Peter Ebdon; Ken Doherty and Jimmy White, lost in the first round. Lee was defeated 7–10 by Lee Walker and Davis lost to Anthony Hamilton by the same score; 1997 champion Doherty was beaten by two-time semi-finalist Joe Swail 6–10 and Ebdon lost 8–10 against Ian McCulloch.
Paul Hunter and Matthew Stevens met in the last 16 for the second consecutive year. Stevens avenged his 6–13 defeat the previous year, coming from behind in the final frames to win a close match. Hunter found himself 2-up-with-3-to-play at 12–10 before missing a frame-ball pink in the 23rd frame which would have given him the match. Stevens took all 3 frames to win the match 13–12.
Doherty's defeat was the first time he had lost in round one since 1995.
O'Sullivan won both his quarter-final and semi-final matches with a session to spare; he defeated Hamilton 13–3 in the last eight.
 O'Sullivan's 17–4 against Hendry was the biggest ever semi-final victory, replacing Hendry's 16–4 win over Terry Griffiths in 1992.

Prize fund 
The breakdown of prize money for this year is shown below:

Winner: £250,000
Runner-up: £125,000
Semi-final: £63,200
Quarter-final: £31,600
Last 16: £17,600
Last 32: £12,000
Last 48: £9,200
Last 64: £5,720
Last 80: £4,560

Last 96: £3,440
Last 128: £1,000
Stage one highest break: £2,000
Stage two highest break: £17,600
Stage one maximum break: £5,000
Stage two maximum break: £147,000
Total: £1,378,920

Main draw
Shown below are the results for each round. The numbers in parentheses beside some of the players are their seeding ranks (each championship has 16 seeds and 16 qualifiers).

Qualifying
The matches were played at Pontin's, Prestatyn Sands in between 10 and 20 February 2004.

1st Round (Best of 19 frames)

 Brian Salmon 10–9  Chris Melling

 Ian Preece 10–8  Justin Astley

 Mike Hallett 10–6  James Leadbetter

 Mehmet Husnu 10–2  Craig MacGillivray

 Joe Delaney 10–6  Rodney Goggins

 Adrian Rosa 10–6  Steve James

 Adam Davies 10–8  David Hall

2nd Round (Best of 19 frames)

 Tom Ford 10–8  Martin Gould

 Craig Butler 10–9  Brian Salmon

 Luke Simmonds 10–8  Matthew Couch

 Ian Preece 9–0  Joe Johnson

 Lee Walker 10–6  Mike Hallett

 Gary Thomson 10–2  Luke Fisher

 Peter Lines 10–4  Ian Brumby

 Dave Gilbert 10–6  Michael Wild

 Rory McLeod 10–7  Mehmet Husnu

 Jason Prince 10–6  Darryn Walker

 Joe Delaney 10–4  Andrew Higginson

 Neil Robertson 10–8  Martin Dziewialtowski

 Simon Bedford 10–5  Ian Sargeant

 Liu Song 10–5  Wayne Brown

 Leo Fernandez 10–9  Paul Sweeny

 Michael Rhodes 10–9  Terry Murphy

 Kwan Poomjang 10–9  Philip Williams

 Garry Hardiman 10–6  Billy Snaddon

 Munraj Pal 10–0  Andy Neck

 Colm Gilcreest 10–7  Steven Bennie

 Ryan Day 10–7  Adrian Rosa

 Tony Jones 10–3  Adam Davies

 Jason Ferguson 10–9  Carlo Giagnacovo

 Ricky Walden 10–0  Stephen Croft

 Joe Meara 10–8  Andrew Norman

 Adrian Gunnell 10–5  Steve Mifsud

 Ding Junhui 10–6  Atthasit Mahitthi

 Paul Davies 10–4  Alain Robidoux

 Supoj Saenla 10–8  Bradley Jones

 Paul Wykes 10–4  Kurt Maflin

 Stuart Mann 10–8  Jamie Cope

 Scott MacKenzie 10–3  Johl Younger

Rounds 3–6

Century breaks
There were 55 centuries in this year's championship. The highest break of the tournament was 145 made by Joe Perry.

 145, 100  Joe Perry
 132, 125, 102  Paul Hunter
 131, 130  John Higgins
 131, 127, 127, 125, 123, 121, 117, 109, 109, 106, 106, 101, 100  Ronnie O'Sullivan
 128, 125, 122, 115, 113, 111, 109, 104  Matthew Stevens
 128, 112, 111  Ryan Day
 127, 119  Steve Davis
 127, 110  Joe Swail
 121, 112  Stephen Maguire
 120  Jimmy White

 117, 113, 108, 106  Ian McCulloch
 117, 110, 103  Stephen Hendry
 117, 106  Graeme Dott
 116  Andy Hicks
 115, 111  Barry Pinches
 109  James Wattana
 108, 105  Mark Williams
 103  Alan McManus
 100  David Gray

References 

2004
World Championship
World Snooker Championship
Sports competitions in Sheffield
World Snooker Championship
World Snooker Championship